US Post Office-Long Beach is a historic post office building located at Long Beach in Nassau County, New York, United States. It was built in 1936 and designed by the Office of the Supervising Architect under the direction of Louis A. Simon.  It is a one-story, symmetrically massed building faced with red brick in the Colonial Revival style.  It features a central five bay wide section with a gable roof, flanked by single bay end pavilions with gable roofs perpendicular to the central section. The lobby features a Treasury Section of Fine Arts mural by Jon Corbino titled The Pleasures of the Bathing Beach (1939).

It was listed on the National Register of Historic Places in 1989.

References

Long Beach
Government buildings completed in 1936
Colonial Revival architecture in New York (state)
Long Beach, New York
National Register of Historic Places in Hempstead (town), New York